Büttelberg is a 530 m high, forest-covered  mountain of Bavaria, Germany. It lies approximately 3 km south of Marktbergel. Since 1952 a broadcasting tower belonging to the Bayerischer Rundfunk is located on the mountain.

Mountains of Bavaria